Universum is a global research and advisory company specializing in employer branding. Part of the StepStone Group and Axel Springer family. The headquarters of the company is located in Stockholm, Sweden.

Universum surveys annually over 1 million students and professionals worldwide to determine what they expect from employers.

History 
Universum was founded in 1988 in Stockholm, Sweden by Lars-Henrik Friis Molin who attended then Stockholm School of Economics.

In 1994, Universum launched the European Student Barometer, US Student Barometer — in 1996, and the Asian Student Barometer — in 1999.

In 2005, the company started consulting on Employer value proposition and acquired the next year the career website WetFeet, founded in 1994.

In 2009, it launched the World's Most Attractive Employers and in 2011, it acquired the career networking platform Doostang.

In 2015, Universum's surveys attracted more than 1 million respondents worldwide.

In May 2018, Universum was acquired by StepStone Group and Axel Springer Company for approximately SEK 500 million according to Dagens industri business newspaper.

In 2020, the company became a corporate member of ESOMAR.

References 

1988 establishments in Sweden